New Standard may refer to:

Aviation

 New Standard Aircraft Company, a company based in the United States that operated from 1927 to 1931
 New Standard D-25, an agricultural and joy-riding aircraft
 New Standard D-29, a trainer aircraft

Media

 The New Standard (newspaper), a free-distribution semi-monthly Jewish newspaper in Columbus, Ohio
 The NewStandard, an online news service that was discontinued in 2007
 The New Standard, the name by which the London Evening Standard was known between 1980 and 1985
 The New Standard, the name by which The Standard (Philippines) was briefly known in 2015–16

Music

 The New Standard (Herbie Hancock album), a 1996 album by Herbie Hancock
 The New Standard (Jamie Saft album), a 2014 album by Jamie Saft, Steve Swallow and Bobby Previte
 New Standards (John Pizzarelli album), a 1994 album by John Pizzarelli
 New Standards (Malachi Thompson album), a 1993 album by Malachi Thompson
 The New Standards, a minimalist jazz trio formed in Minneapolis, Minnesota, in 2005
 New standard tuning, a tuning for the guitar that approximates all-fifths tuning